Sukhishvili is a Georgian surname. Notable people with the surname include:

Iliko Sukhishvili, dancer, founder of the Georgian National Ballet theatre
Levan Sukhishvili, prime minister of Georgian SSR (January 1931 - 22 September 1931);

Georgian-language surnames